Mali Beograd is an urban neighborhood of the city of Novi Sad, Serbia. It is located on the northern bank of Danube-Tisa-Danube canal, between Vidovdansko Naselje and Oil Refinery. Large number of inhabitants of Mali Beograd are ethnic Roma.

See also
Neighborhoods of Novi Sad

References

Zoran Rapajić, Novi Sad bez tajni, Beograd, 2002.

Novi Sad neighborhoods